Brad Hooker (born 13 September 1957) is a British-American philosopher who specialises in moral philosophy. He is a professor at the University of Reading and is best known for his work defending rule consequentialism (often treated as being synonymous with rule utilitarianism).

His book Ideal Code, Real World received a number of favourable reviews from high-profile philosophers. Derek Parfit, for example, wrote: "This book seems to me the best statement and defence, so far, of one of the most important moral theories."

Education 

Hooker initially studied philosophy at Princeton University before pursuing his BPhil and DPhil at the University of Oxford from 1981 to 1986, where he was a member of St Anne's College, and was taught and supervised by Parfit, James Griffin, and Richard Hare.

Hooker's rule-consequentialism 
One of the most common objections to rule-consequentialism is that it is incoherent, because it is based on the consequentialist principle that we should be concerned with maximising the good, but then tells us not to act to maximise the good, but to follow rules (even in cases where we know that breaking the rule could produce better results).

Hooker avoids this objection by not basing his form of rule-consequentialism on the ideal of maximising the good. He writes:

…the best argument for rule-consequentialism is not that it derives from an overarching commitment to maximise the good. The best argument for rule-consequentialism is that it does a better job than its rivals of matching and tying together our moral convictions, as well as offering us help with our moral disagreements and uncertainties.

Selected bibliography

Books 
 
 
 
 
Reviewed in:

Chapters in books

Journal articles 
  Pdf of individual article.

Podcast

References

External links 
 Profile page: Brad Hooker University of Reading
 Full text of doctoral thesis "Why should I be moral?" via Oxford Research Archive

1957 births
English philosophers
Consequentialists
Academics of the University of Reading
Alumni of St Anne's College, Oxford
Princeton University alumni
Living people